Jena Kpeng is a farming community in Savelugu-Nanton District in the Northern Region of Ghana.

See also

Jisonaayili

References 

Communities in Ghana
Savelugu-Nanton District